Lysergic acid 2,4-dimethylazetidide (LA-SS-Az, LSZ) is an analog of LSD developed by the team led by David E. Nichols at Purdue University. It was developed as a rigid analog of LSD with the diethylamide group constrained into an azetidine ring in order to map the binding site at the 5-HT2A receptor. There are three possible stereoisomers around the azetidine ring, with the (S,S)-(+) isomer being the most active, slightly more potent than LSD itself in drug discrimination tests using trained rats.

There have been several unconfirmed reports of lysergic acid 2,4-dimethylazetidide being synthesized in illicit laboratories and distributed on blotter paper or in liquid solution under names such as "diazedine" and "λ".

In 2013 LSZ also appeared on some designer drug and research chemical markets in the UK. LSZ later gained international popularity through a small cluster of mail-order novel psychedelic shops that appeared in 2012.

Legal status

On June 10, 2014 the UK Advisory Council on the Misuse of Drugs (ACMD) recommended that LSZ be specifically named in the UK Misuse of Drugs Act as a class A drug despite not identifying any harm associated with its use. The UK Home office accepted this advice and announced a ban of the substance to be enacted on 6 January 2015 as part of The Misuse of Drugs Act 1971 (Amendment) (No. 2) Order 2014.

LSZ is illegal in Switzerland as of December 2015, in Denmark as of May 2015, and in Sweden as of January 26, 2016.

See also 
 Lysergic acid diethylamide (LSD)
 1cP-LSD
 1B-LSD
 1P-LSD
 1V-LSD
 ALD-52
 1cP-AL-LAD
 AL-LAD
 ETH-LAD
 1P-ETH-LAD
 PRO-LAD
 LSM-775
 O-Acetylpsilocin (4-AcO-DMT)

References 

Lysergamides
Azetidines
Designer drugs
Psychedelia
Serotonin receptor agonists